Mullaivananathar Temple (முல்லைவனநாதர் கோயில்)  is a Hindu temple located at Thirumullaivasal in Mayiladuthurai district of Tamil Nadu, India which is dedicated to Shiva.

History 

The temple was constructed by the Early Chola king Killivalavan. The presiding deity is called as Mullaivana Nathar. His consort is known as Ani Konda Kothai Ammai. It is believed that goddess had her initiation in this place.

Significance 
It is one of the shrines of the 275 Paadal Petra Sthalams - Shiva Sthalams glorified in the early medieval Tevaram poems by Tamil Saivite Nayanar Tirugnanasambandar. The temple is counted as one of the temples built on the northern banks of River Kaveri.

Literary Mention 
Tirugnanasambandar describes the feature of the deity as:

References

External links 
 
 

Shiva temples in Mayiladuthurai district
Padal Petra Stalam